FHB Mortgage Bank was Hungary's largest mortgage re-financer. Formerly state-owned, it was floated on the stock market in 2003, and the government sold its remaining A shares in 2007. As of 17 August 2011, FHB Mortgage Bank Co. Plc. had market capitalization of US$232.4 million.

References

External links
 FHB official website
  https://web.archive.org/web/20080207210850/http://www.bse.hu/menun_kivuli/portlets/companyprofile?security=3263

Banks of Hungary
Banks established in 1997
Banks disestablished in 2016
Companies based in Budapest
Hungarian brands
Hungarian companies established in 1997